Burang may refer to:

Burang County, county in Tibet
Burang Town, town in Burang County
Burang, Iran, a village in South Khorasan Province, Iran